The Honda Civic Si is a sport compact trim of Honda's Civic. The Si (Sport Injected) trim was introduced for the third generation of Honda Civics in both Japan and North America. In Canada and elsewhere, the trim became known as the SiR for the sixth and seventh generations, and since the "Si" badge there was used for a USDM Civic EX model. 

For the Japanese and European markets, the Civic Type R was adopted as the high-performance variant of the Civic, starting with the EK9 hatch for Japan in 1996 and then with the EP3 hatch for  Europe in 2001. The 2017 model year marked the first time that the Civic Type R was sold in North America, previous to this the Si trim was the highest in North America (except for Acura vehicles). While the Civic Type R has a more powerful engine, plus it available in a more track-oriented and spartan configuration including less sound deadening and amenities, by contrast the Civic Si has been positioned as more of a full-featured sport trim, featuring luxury options such as a sunroof and a seven-speaker audio system.

1984–1987

Honda first adopted the Si badge for the Japanese domestic market (JDM) third-generation Civic in November 1984. The Civic Si also appeared in New Zealand and Australia in 1987, with specifications similar to those of the American-market Si.

1988–1991

Initially, the Civic Si hatchback was absent from the 1988 Civic lineup, with only the CRX Si offered this model year. In 1989, however, the Civic Si hatchback was reintroduced to the US market.

1992–1995

The 1992-1995 Civic Si model featured disc brakes, a power moonroof with tilt, cruise control, a dashboard clock, a 9,000 rpm tachometer with a 7,200 rpm redline, plastic wheel covers on 14-inch wheels, power side mirrors (body coloured, beginning in 1993), body-coloured door handles, and a  1.6 L single-overhead cam D16Z6 VTEC engine with a 5-speed manual transmission. VTEC activated on the intake side and not the exhaust side, which was the result of the spark plug blocking the area where the cam follower would be. In 1994, rear speakers and optional anti-lock brakes were also added.

1996–2000

The Honda Civic Si was not sold in the US during model years 1996-1998. It entered the market again for the 1999 and 2000 model years. After this brief hiatus, the Civic Si reappeared for 1999, available as a coupé only. With the adoption of the VTi badge in Europe and the SiR and Type R badges in Asia for the sports variants of Civics, the Si became primarily a US-specific badge, a branding trend that would continue in subsequent Civic generations. This (and the subsequent) generation of sporting Civics were sold as the Civic SiR in Canada, since that market's "Civic Si" badge was used for a USDM Civic EX.

2001–2005

The EP3 Civic Si of the US and EP3 Civic SiR of Canada were marketed as the North American versions of the European EP3 Honda Civic Type R, manufactured in Swindon, England. Unlike other generations of the Civic Si, it does not share a body style or interior with the regular USDM Civic (offered only in sedan and coupé forms). For the seventh generation, the "Civic Si" badge was used on a version of the Civic EX in Canada.

2006–2011

The eighth-generation Civic Si continued to be the sportiest Civic on offer in North America, although the badge was used on a somewhat sporting model in Europe (where the Type-R sits atop the lineup). The US model has a  version of the K20 engine (K20Z3), a 6-speed manual transmission, sport seats, and different styling. The Civic Si coupe debuted a few months after the initial launch of the 2006 models, with the Civic Si sedan following for the 2007 model year. In addition to being built at Honda's Alliston, Ontario plant, the car was also manufactured at Sumaré, São Paulo, Brazil by Honda Brazil from January 2008.

2012–2015

The ninth generation was the first generation to use a different engine than other models of the Honda Civic. The ninth generation Civic Si is available as a Coupe and as a Sedan. Honda uses a new 2.4 L K-Series (K24Z7) which has increased displacement through longer piston stroke than the K20Z3 from the eighth-generation Civic Si, yet the K24Z7 retains the 11.0:1 compression used in the K20Z3. The K24Z7 is different from the K24Z6 found in the 2012-14 Honda CR-V; the CR-V has lower compression and a different, efficiency-oriented VTEC design.

The redline of the K24Z7 is 7,000 rpm with a fuel cut at 7,200 rpm. A 6-speed manual transmission with a helical LSD (Limited Slip Differential) is still offered as the only available transmission option for the Civic Si. The wing spoilers are different from the 8th generation, and the interior of the car received slight updates with the addition of a rev limit indicator and a power meter displayed in the new i-MID (intelligent Multi-Information Display). Sway bars have been changed to  front,  rear, from the  front,  rear, in 8th generation. The chassis is more rigid, and the curb weight is slightly lower than the 8th generation.

Announced at the 2011 SEMA Show in Las Vegas a HFP (Honda Factory Performance) version of the Civic Si Coupe was made available in a limited production of dealer installed performance parts which included:
Lowered Suspension
 HFP Diamond Cut Alloy Wheels
Michelin Pilot Super Sport tires sized in 215/40-18
Full body Kit including front, rear and side skirts
HFP Badging
HFP Branded Floor mats

In Canada, the production was limited to 400 (200 Black Coupes, 200 White Coupes). In the US, the production was limited to 500 available in all of the colors Honda offered the Civic Si Coupe in. After the 2015 model year, Honda did not produce the Civic Si for 2016, citing poor sales.

2017–2020

The 2017 Honda Civic Si (tenth generation) was revealed in a live YouTube broadcast on 6 April 2017. It is powered by a more powerful version of the 1.5 L turbocharged four-cylinder engine used in other Civics. It went on sale during May 2017 in the United States as either a coupe or sedan. It is based on the 10th generation Honda Civic Sport Touring, both the sedan and coupe variants. Peak horsepower is reached at 5700 rpm, while low end maximum torque is available between 2,100 and 5,000 rpm. The suspension has been tuned and stiffened over the standard Civic. 

The body includes highly upgraded chassis and drive components, including a dual-pinion adaptive electric power steering system with variable ratios, sport-tuned suspension, an adaptive damper system, a helical limited-slip differential, larger front brake rotors and wider 235/40 R18 tires. In addition to adaptive dampers, suspension upgrades over the Civic Sport Touring include stiffer spring rates, more rigid stabilizer bars (+7 percent front, +26 percent rear), and solid front and rear compliance bushings, the latter shared with the track-focused Civic Type R.

2021–present

The eleventh-generation Civic Si was unveiled in October 2021 for the 2022 model year. It is only available as a sedan with the discontinuation of the coupe bodystyle. It uses a direct injected 1.5 L turbocharged four-cylinder with variable timing control on the intake and exhaust valves, and variable valve lift on the exhaust valves. Peak horsepower is reached at 6000 rpm, while low end maximum torque is available between 1,800 and 5,000 rpm.

The manual transmission gains a rev-matching mode from the Type R, and has been reworked. Mechanical differences include better exhaust system flow, fixed-rate dampers and larger brake rotors.

Media coverage
In Insurance Bureau of Canada's report on top 10 most stolen vehicles in 2005, 2000 Honda Civic Si 2-door, 1999 Honda Civic Si coupe, 1994 Honda Civic Si 2-door Hatchback, 1995 Honda Civic Si 2-door Hatchback are listed as ranks #1, #2, #5, #8 respectively. The sixth and seventh generation Civic Si were badged as a Civic SiR in Canada. The Honda Civic is also the most popular passenger vehicle in Canada.

References

External links
 2022 Civic Si Official Site

Si
Cars introduced in 1984
1990s cars
2000s cars
2010s cars
2020s cars
Sport compact cars
Coupés
Sports sedans
Front-wheel-drive sports cars